Kemal Cenap Berksoy (1875–28 November 1949) was a Turkish politician and physician.

He graduated from the Turkish Military Medicine school. He was also a distinguished (Turkish: Ordinaryüs) professor. He became a deputy from Istanbul for the 7th parliament and from Yozgat for the 8th parliament in the Grand National Assembly of Turkey. He had two children.

References 

1875 births
1949 deaths
Republican People's Party (Turkey) politicians
Physicians from the Ottoman Empire